Ambocybe is a monotypic genus of hymenopteran insects of the family Eulophidae, from the Indomalayan and Australasian Regions.

References

Key to Nearctic eulophid genera
Universal Chalcidoidea Database 

Eulophidae